JOOY-DTV, virtual channel 4 (UHF digital channel 16), branded as  (formerly  until 23 July 2011), is the Kansai region key station of the Japan News Network, owned by Mainichi Broadcasting System, Inc.

Programming

 Animeism
 
 
 Drama Shower

History 
 See Mainichi Broadcasting System#History of MBS.

Availability

Analog
 Analog broadcasting ceased in 2011.
JOOR-TV
Mt. Ikoma: Channel 4

Digital
JOOY-DTV (previously JOOR-DTV)
Mt. Ikoma: Channel 16 (Remote controller button: 4)

See also 
 MBS Radio (Japan)

References

External links 
 

Mainichi Broadcasting System
Kansai region
Japan News Network
Companies based in Osaka
Television in Japan
Television channels and stations established in 1959
1959 establishments in Japan